Martina Svetozarova Gledacheva (born 12 March 1991) is a former tennis player from Bulgaria.

In September 2011, she reached her career-high singles ranking of world No. 399. In May 2011, she peaked at No. 502 in the doubles rankings.

In May 2012, Gledacheva played her last match on the ITF Circuit in Florence, Italy. In 2020 she married Joseph Harari.

ITF Circuit finals

Singles: 6 (6 runner–ups)

Doubles: 7 (2 titles, 5 runner–ups)

References

External links

 
 
 
 http://www.spaziotennis.com/2009/08/martina-gledacheva-soffia-il-vento-dellest/
 http://www.spaziotennis.com/2010/12/gledacheva-martina-intervista-2010/

1991 births
Living people
Sportspeople from Plovdiv
Bulgarian female tennis players
21st-century Bulgarian women